The table below lists the accredited, university-based business schools available in Uganda . The list also includes the university that each school is affiliated with and whether the school is private or public. The schools are listed alphabetically.

Makerere University Business School (MUBS), was formerly affiliated with Makerere University. It has been granted autonomy to separate from its former parent institution. A new name is under formulation.

See also
 List of universities in Uganda
 Education in Uganda

References

External links
2013 Ranking of 10 Top Universities In Uganda
2014 Rankings of Universities In Uganda At Webometrics.info

 
Uganda
Uganda, Business schools
Business schools
Uganda